Mesyla was a town of ancient Pontus on the Iris near Comana Pontica.

Its site is unlocated.

References

Populated places in ancient Pontus
Former populated places in Turkey
Lost ancient cities and towns